"Go D.J." is the second single from Lil Wayne's fourth studio album, Tha Carter. The single's famous drum beat is produced by DJ Mannie Fresh, who also provides vocals in the song.
The lyrics to the song are both written and performed by Lil Wayne. The single became Lil Wayne's first solo hit, reaching the top three on the US Rap Charts and becoming a top 20 single. The song was Lil Wayne's most successful single as a lead artist until "Lollipop" reached number one in 2008.

The song's chorus is borrowed from an earlier song of the same title by New Orleans rap group U.N.L.V. It is also featured in the racing game Midnight Club 3: Dub Edition and its remix version.

Music video
The video is set in a prison (the Mansfield Reformatory, where The Shawshank Redemption was shot) and begins with Mannie Fresh attacking a prison guard in his office, which leads to Lil Wayne being freed from an electric chair, which leads to a riot in the prison. Wayne is then shown in numerous different areas, including the cafeteria, his cell and the prison yard, where he is watching a boxing match in a crowd of people. Lil Wayne spends much of the video surrounded by female officers, who serve him food, follow him around and lead him into the showers. The video ends with Lil Wayne being released from prison. It features cameo appearances from Birdman, Ronald 'Slim' Williams, Mannie Fresh, Gillie Da Kid, and C-Murder.

Charts

Weekly charts

Year-end charts

Certifications

Release history

References

2004 singles
2004 songs
Lil Wayne songs
Songs written by Lil Wayne
Song recordings produced by Mannie Fresh
Cash Money Records singles
Songs written by Mannie Fresh